The Atlantic Hockey All-Tournament Team is an honor bestowed at the conclusion of the NCAA Division I Atlantic Hockey conference tournament to the players judged to have performed the best during the championship. Currently the team is composed of three forwards, two defensemen and one goaltender with additional players named in the event of a tie.

The All-Tournament Team began being awarded after the first championship in 2004. It is a continuation of the MAAC All-Tournament Team (listed below) after Atlantic Hockey was formed after the dissolution of the MAAC ice hockey conference. During the second  year of the tournament a trio of players were tabbed as the 'Three Stars of the Tournament' in lieu of naming an All-Tournament Team.

All-Tournament Teams

MAAC Teams

2000s

2010s

2020s

All-Tournament Team players by school

Multiple appearances

See also
Atlantic Hockey Awards
Atlantic Hockey Most Valuable Player in Tournament

References

External links
Atlantic Hockey Online

College ice hockey trophies and awards in the United States